Emsfors is a bimunicipal locality situated in Oskarshamn Municipality and Mönsterås Municipality in Kalmar County, Sweden with 332 inhabitants in 2010.

References 

Populated places in Kalmar County
Populated places in Mönsterås Municipality
Populated places in Oskarshamn Municipality